Ring Out Joy is the third album by tenor saxophonist Ed Summerlin, recorded in April 1968 and released later that year on the Avant-Garde label. The album marks a return to the religious concerns that characterized Summerlin's 1960 debut LP, Liturgical Jazz.

Track listing

Personnel
 Ed Summerlin – tenor saxophone, conductor
 Don Heckman – alto saxophone
 George Marge – tenor saxophone
 Marvin Stamm – trumpet
 Bob Norden – trombone
 Tony Studd – trombone
 Ron Carter – double bass
 Richard Davis – double bass
 Ed Shaughnessy – drums
 Rosemary Unutmaz – vocals on "Gift of Joy" 
 William Robert Miller – text
 Choir recorded in London, April 14–20, 1968

References

1968 albums
Jazz albums by American artists